The May 2016 United States storm complex was a storm system that triggered a flood in the United States on May 31, 2016, affecting the states of Arkansas, Kansas, Nebraska, Oklahoma, and Texas. The inundation set precipitation records in Texas and Oklahoma.  On June 2, 2016, the rising of the Brazos River required evacuations for portions of Brazoria County, Texas. Meteorologists attributed this storm's devastation to the power of the El Niño climate cycle.

Statewide Disaster Proclamation
On June 1, 2016, Texas Governor Greg Abbott to issued a statewide Disaster Proclamation in 31 counties, including: Austin, Bandera, Bastrop, Brazoria, Brazos, Burleson, Coleman, Colorado, Erath, Fayette, Fort Bend, Grimes, Hidalgo, Hood, Jasper, Kleberg, Lee, Leon, Liberty, Lubbock, Montgomery, Palo Pinto, Parker, Polk, Robertson, San Jacinto, Tyler, Walker, Waller, Washington and Wharton counties.

References

June 2016 events in the United States
May 2016 events in the United States
2016 floods in the United States
2016 in Arkansas
2016 in Kansas
2016 in Nebraska
2016 in Oklahoma
2016 in Texas
2016 meteorology
Brazos River
Floods in Texas
Natural disasters in Arkansas
Natural disasters in Kansas
Natural disasters in Nebraska
Natural disasters in Oklahoma